The Hereditary Quartermaster General of the Sacred Apostolic Palace was one of the ceremonial offices within the Roman curia, before the reform of the Pontifical Household in 1968. It was vested in the Marquesses  Sacchetti, and is currently held by Marquess Giovanni Sacchetti.  The former holder, Marquess Giovanni's father Marquess Giulio, was the highest layman in the Vatican for 30 years, post the reforms of 1968. He died in 2010.

List of office holders 

Girolamo Sacchetti (1840–1864)
Urbano Sacchetti (1864–1912)
Clemente Sacchetti (1912–1919)
Luigi Tommaso Sacchetti (1919–1936)
Enrico Urbano Sacchetti (1936–1958)
Urbano Sacchetti (1958–1970)

References 

Officials of the Roman Curia
Honorary titles of the Holy See
Papal household